The Last Days of Ptolemy Grey is an American drama streaming television limited series created by Walter Mosley for Apple TV+. Based on the 2010 novel of the same name by Mosley, the series stars Samuel L. Jackson, Dominique Fishback, Cynthia McWilliams, Damon Gupton, and Marsha Stephanie Blake. It premiered on March 11, 2022, and concluded on April 8, 2022, consisting of six episodes.

The series received seven Black Reel Award nominations, winning four, including Outstanding Television Movie or Limited Series. It also received six NAACP Image Award nominations, while Jackson and Fishback were both nominated for Critics' Choice Awards for their performances.

Premise
A lonely 91-year-old man with dementia is temporarily able to remember his past and uses the time to investigate the death of his nephew.

Cast

Main
Samuel L. Jackson as Ptolemy Grey
Dominique Fishback as Robyn
Cynthia Kaye McWilliams as Sensia
Damon Gupton as Coydog
Marsha Stephanie Blake as Niecie
Walton Goggins as Dr. Rubin

Supporting
Omar Benson Miller as Reggie Lloyd
Maury Ginsberg as Moishe Abromovitz
JoAnn Willette as Judge Alison McCarty
Arischa Conner as Sonia Lavendrell
DeRon Horton as Hilly
Percy Daggs IV as Young Ptolemy

Episodes

Production
The series was announced in December 2020, with Samuel L. Jackson set to star in and executive produce the series with Walter Mosley adapting his own novel into the screenplay. Dominique Fishback was added to the cast in March 2021. Walton Goggins, Marsha Stephanie Blake, Damon Gupton, Cynthia Kaye McWilliams and Omar Benson Miller were added to the cast in April 2021, with production beginning that month. Episodes were directed by Ramin Bahrani, Debbie Allen, Hanelle Culpepper, and Guillermo Navarro. Filming concluded on June 26, 2021. Craig DeLeon is the composer for the limited series.

Release 
The limited series premiered on March 11, 2022 on Apple TV+.

Reception

Critical response
The review aggregator website Rotten Tomatoes reported an 88% approval rating with an average rating of 7.1/10, based on 41 critic reviews. The website's critics consensus reads, "The Last Days of Ptolemy Grey loses some luster in its final stretch, but Samuel L. Jackson and Dominique Fishback's sterling performances make this an unmissable elegy." Metacritic, which uses a weighted average, assigned a score of 75 out of 100 based on 22 critics, indicating "generally favorable reviews".

Accolades

References

External links
 

2020s American drama television miniseries
Television shows based on American novels
2022 American television series debuts
2022 American television series endings
Apple TV+ original programming
Television series by Anonymous Content
Television shows about diseases and disorders
English-language television shows